Albatros D.VI was the designation given to a prototype single-seat twin-boom pusher biplane built in 1917 in Germany. It was armed with a fixed  LMG 08/15 machine gun and a fixed  Becker Type M2 cannon.

The aircraft's undercarriage was damaged on landing from its maiden flight in February 1918 and was never repaired, the project being abandoned in May of that year due to other projects of higher priority. The  Mercedes D.IIIa engine was eventually removed for use in a different aircraft.

Specifications

References

 Green, W. & Swanborough, G. (1994). The Complete Book of Fighters. London: Salamander Books. 

Biplanes
Single-engined pusher aircraft
1910s German fighter aircraft
Military aircraft of World War I
D.06
Twin-boom aircraft
Aircraft first flown in 1918